Rezunovka is a rural locality (a selo) in Muravyevsky Selsoviet of Tambovsky District, Amur Oblast, Russia. The population was 193 as of 2018. There are 9 streets.

Geography 
Rezunovka is located on the Gilchin River, 57 km southwest of Tambovka (the district's administrative centre) by road. Muravyovka is the nearest rural locality.

References 

Rural localities in Tambovsky District, Amur Oblast